WOW Hits 2016 is a two-disc compilation album featuring some of the biggest songs on Christian radio for 2014 and 2015. The standard edition features 33 tracks in total, and the deluxe edition features 39 in total. The compilation was released on September 25, 2015.  The album has sold 140,000 copies in the United States as of August 2016.

Track listing

Chart performance

References

WOW Hits albums